Penda Sy (born April 29 1984 in Loudeac, France) is a French basketball player who played 6 times for the French women's national basketball team in 2004. Penda's brother Pape Sy is also a basketball player.  Sy's family is originally from Senegal.

References

French women's basketball players
French sportspeople of Senegalese descent
1984 births
Living people
Sportspeople from Côtes-d'Armor